The 1936–37 NCAA men's basketball season began in December 1936, progressed through the regular season and conference tournaments, and concluded in March 1937.

Season headlines 

 In February 1943, the Helms Athletic Foundation retroactively selected Stanford as its national champion for the 1936–37 season.
 In 1995, the Premo-Porretta Power Poll retroactively selected Stanford as its national champion for the 1936–37 season.

Conference membership changes

Regular season

Conference winners and tournaments

Statistical leaders

Awards

Consensus All-American team

Major player of the year awards 

 Helms Player of the Year: Hank Luisetti, Stanford (retroactive selection in 1944)

Other major awards 

 Haggerty Award (Top player in New York City metro area): Ben Kramer, Long Island

Coaching changes

References